Paula Andrea Mejias Rodriguez (born 4 April 1994) is a Puerto Rican female artistic gymnast and part of the national team.  She participated at the 2015 World Artistic Gymnastics Championships in Glasgow.

References

1994 births
Living people
Gymnasts at the 2019 Pan American Games
People from Arroyo, Puerto Rico
Puerto Rican female artistic gymnasts
Pan American Games competitors for Puerto Rico